is a Japanese football player for Tokyo Musashino City FC.

Club statistics
Updated to 23 February 2018.

References

External links

Profile at YSCC Yokohama

1991 births
Living people
Nihon University alumni
Association football people from Tokyo
Japanese footballers
J3 League players
YSCC Yokohama players
Suzuka Point Getters players
Tokyo Musashino United FC players
Association football midfielders